The Special Operations Command Central (SOCCENT) is a sub-unified command of the U.S. Central Command (USCENTCOM). It is responsible for planning special operations throughout the USCENTCOM area of responsibility (AOR), planning and conducting peacetime joint/combined special operations training exercises, and orchestrating command and control of peacetime and wartime special operations as directed.

The command is headquartered at MacDill Air Force Base in Tampa, Florida. SOCCENT FWD (formerly known as Combined Forces Special Operations Component Command) is located at Al Udeid in Qatar. The Command's motto is Molon labe (Greek for "Come and take them", was said by King Leonidas I of Sparta before the Battle of Thermopylae in response to the Persian demand to surrender their weapons.)

In the initial stages of Operation Enduring Freedom in Afghanistan, the formation's commander was Rear Admiral Albert Calland. SOCCENT stood up Joint Special Operations Task Forces (JSOTFs). Beginning on 5 October 2001, Joint Special Operations Task Force-North (JSOTFN) was established under command of Col Frank Kisner at Karshi-Kanabad (K2), Uzbekistan, and the bombing of Afghanistan began on 7 October. The 5th Special Forces Group, under the command of COL John Mulholland, deployed to K2 and formed the core of this JSOTF, more commonly known as Task Force Dagger. Unconventional Warfare became DAGGER's principal mission. This task force included aviators from the 160th SOAR (A) and Special Tactics personnel from AFSOC. A comparable task force, Task Force K-Bar, deployed to southern Afghanistan.

In the lead-up to the 2003 invasion of Iraq, SOCCENT assigned the 5th Special Forces Group the task of establishing Combined Joint Special Operations Task Force-West (CJSOTF-W), and its three battalions would constitute the bulk of the task force. As operations approached, CJSOTF-W grew to include Australian and British special forces, Psychological Operations (PSYOP) elements from B Company, 9th PSYOP Battalion, and 301st PSYOP Company, with Civil Affairs augmentation.

Most U.S. special operations forces left Iraq in May and June 2003. CJSOTF-N/Task Force Viking was deactivated, and CJSOTF-W was re-designated CJSOTF-Arabian Peninsula (CJSOTFAP), having moved to Baghdad in April. By July 2003, CJSOTF-AP had drawn down to the 5th Special Forces Group Headquarters, consisting of one Naval Special Warfare Task Unit (NSWTU) and one FOB. The FOB commanded 14 ODAs, a few of them at full strength. The bulk of these forces remained in Baghdad with outstations covering Al Qaim, Ramadi/Fallujah, Najaf/Nasiriyah, Hillah, Kut/Amarah, Tikrit, Balad, Samarra, and Kirkuk.

According to a 2006 online edition of Special Operations Technology magazine, SOCCENT, operating with coalition partners as the CFSOCC, consists of two combined joint special operations task forces [CJSOTFs], one Combined Joint Special Operations Aviation Command (also referred to as 'Component'), which seems to be at Balad Air Base, one joint psychological operations task force, one Naval Special Warfare Unit and three Special Operations command and control elements [SOCCEs].

The two CJSOTFs are CJSOTF-Arabian Peninsula, whose headquarters directs United States Army Special Forces and CJSOTF Afghanistan.
Combined Joint Special Operations Task Force-Arabian Peninsula (CJSOTF-AP) is a "white," or unclassified, special operations task force that is always organized around the headquarters of the 5th Special Forces Group or 10th Special Forces Group. Combined Joint Special Operations Task Force-Arabian Peninsula (CJSOTF-AP), itself answers to While information is scarce, it consists of two battalions of the United States Army Special Forces (the 'Green Berets') and a west coast-based Navy SEAL Team.  CJSOTF-AP is task-organized into three Special Operations Task Forces (SOTFs): SOTF-Central, SOTF-North, and SOTF-West.

CJSOTF Afghanistan's headquarters has been provided in rotation by a number of Army Special Forces Groups, including the 3rd and the 19th. CJSOTF Afghanistan has included elements of the 7th Special Forces Group operating in southern provinces, including Kandahar, as Task Force 71.

Unit decorations
The unit awards depicted below are for Headquarters, US Special Operations Command Central at MacDill AFB. Award for unit decorations do not apply to any subordinate organizations, commands, or any other activities unless the orders specifically address them.

References

External links
 SOCCENT on Facebook
 Global Defence Review, A bid for freedom – description of SOCCENT's activities during the 2003 Iraq war
 https://fas.org/irp/agency/dod/socom/sof-ref-2-1/SOFREF_Ch2.htm – FAS site

Organizations based in Tampa, Florida
+Central